Blackhawk is an unincorporated planned community and census-designated place located in Contra Costa County, California, United States, east of Danville and Oakland. As of the 2010 census it had a population of 9,354. Governed by county rules/regulations and a homeowner association (HOA), Blackhawk has a country club, two golf courses, sports complex, restaurants, and the adjacent Blackhawk Plaza. 24-hour security plus additional law enforcement contracted through the Contra Costa County Sheriff's Office is provided by HOA dues. The area is covered by the San Ramon Valley Fire Protection District. The ZIP code is 94506. The community is inside area code 925. Blackhawk is known for its uniform architecture and suburban lifestyle, with the median household income being $167,875 and median home price of $1,117,500.

Blackhawk Ranch, 1917 to 1979
Blackhawk Ranch was established in 1917 by Ansel Mills Easton and his son-in-law William Q. Ward, in an area east of the San Ramon and Sycamore Valleys. The name came from a famous Irish racehorse named Blackhawk that Easton's family had once owned. The land passed through the hands of several owners, including Raymond Force (the owner of the Caterpillar Tractor Company), the Hawaii-based sugar and pineapple company Castle & Cooke and Howard Peterson (owner of Peterson Tractor).

Critics charged that the plan would have various negative impacts, related to urban sprawl, environmental damage and violations of the County General Plan. A group of environmentalists and local residents called Amigos de Diablo organized against the Blackhawk Development Corporation, but were sued for libel.

Communities

 Hidden Oaks consists of 206 homes and in 1978 was the first Blackhawk community to be completed. Most homes are on half-acre lots.
 Silveroak is an upscale condo complex.
 Silver Maple is designed around one of the main Blackhawk Country Clubs's golf holes, though no roads connect it to the rest of the main Blackhawk Country Club.  It consists of approximately 110 custom homes between 2500-5000 Square Feet.
 Blackhawk Country Club ("Main Gates") is the largest of the six communities.
In addition to Blackhawk, there are also numerous surrounding communities, including: 
 Alamo Creek
 Bettencourt Ranch
 Northridge
 Monterosso

Blackhawk Country Club
Opened in 1979, Blackhawk Country Club is a highly exclusive 4,800 acre (19 km) country club community at the base of Mt. Diablo where luxurious residential neighborhoods are surrounded by thousands of acres of permanent open lands.  Eagle Ridge Dr. gives way to a separate gate which leads to extremely exclusive estates, including the  Behring estate.

In the middle of Country Club West is the 6,904 yard (6,313 m) Lakeside golf course, designed by Bruce Devlin and Robert Von Hagge.  The Lakeside course hosted the CVS/pharmacy LPGA Challenge, an event on the LPGA Tour from 2005 -2010. The newer 6,700 yard (6,126 m) Falls golf course, designed by Ted Robinson, winds through Country Club East.  Blackhawk's Tennis Club includes 20 tennis courts, a clubhouse and a pro shop.  The Blackhawk Swim Club includes a competition-sized pool, a spa and dressing rooms and offers instructional programs.  The 25 acre (100,000 m2) Sports and Recreation Center includes basketball courts, outdoor volleyball courts, a children's play park, Olympic-sized pool, sports fields and an amphitheater.

Land use
4,800 acres (19 km) total
2,000 acres (8 km) contiguous designated for expansion of adjacent Mt. Diablo State Park
1,000 acres (4 km) for natural hillside, parks, golf courses and sports fields
2,400 home sites total
45 acres (182,000 m2) developed as a 450,000 square foot (42,000 m2) commercial center

Blackhawk Plaza 

Blackhawk Plaza, opened 1989, is an outdoor shopping center encircling a long duck pond located near the Blackhawk Country Club. It includes retail stores, restaurants, a movie theater, and two museums, including the Blackhawk Museum.

Demographics

The 2010 United States Census reported that Blackhawk had a population of 9,354. The racial makeup of Blackhawk was 6,882 (73.6%) White, 172 (1.8%) African American, 15 (0.2%) Native American, 1,801 (19.3%) Asian, 8 (0.1%) Pacific Islander, 75 (0.8%) from other races, and 401 (4.3%) from two or more races. Hispanic or Latino of any race were 464 persons (5.0%).

The Census reported that 100% of the population lived in households.

There were 3,345 households, out of which 1,241 (37.1%) had children under the age of 18 living in them, 2,661 (79.6%) were opposite-sex married couples living together, 155 (4.6%) had a female householder with no husband present, 86 (2.6%) had a male householder with no wife present.  There were 76 (2.3%) unmarried opposite-sex partnerships, and 21 (0.6%) same-sex married couples or partnerships. 355 households (10.6%) were made up of individuals, and 145 (4.3%) had someone living alone who was 65 years of age or older. The average household size was 2.80.  There were 2,902 families (86.8% of all households); the average family size was 3.00.

The population was spread out, with 2,271 people (24.3%) under the age of 18, 502 people (5.4%) aged 18 to 24, 1,394 people (14.9%) aged 25 to 44, 3,875 people (41.4%) aged 45 to 64, and 1,312 people (14.0%) who were 65 years of age or older.  The median age was 48.0 years. For every 100 females, there were 96.3 males.  For every 100 females age 18 and over, there were 94.6 males.

The homeowner vacancy rate was 1.3%; the rental vacancy rate was 3.8%.  8,400 people (89.8% of the population) lived in owner-occupied housing units and 954 people (10.2%) lived in rental housing units.

Popular culture
Blackhawk is mentioned in the hit song "Salvation" by the punk band Rancid, as a place "where all the rich people hide."

Blackhawk is also mentioned in The Lonely Island's short film The Unauthorized Bash Brothers Experience as the place where the titular Bash Brothers reside.

A further reference is made in the song "Spike" on the album Money Money 2020  by the group The Network  which includes members from Green Day.

See also
Danville, California

References

External links 
 Blackhawk Country Club
 Blackhawk Auto Museum
 Blackhawk Plaza

Census-designated places in Contra Costa County, California
Unincorporated communities in California
Census-designated places in California
Unincorporated communities in Contra Costa County, California